The Jamaica national beach soccer team represents Jamaica in international beach soccer competitions and is controlled by the JFF, the governing body for football in Jamaica.

They appear to have stopped playing as of 2021.

Current squad
Correct as of August 2015

Coach: Andrew Francis Price

Achievements
CONCACAF Beach Soccer Championship Best: Fifth Place
2006

References

External links
Squad

North American national beach soccer teams
Beach Soccer